Vania Rossi (born 3 October 1983) is a professional cyclocross bicycle racer from Italy. On 29 January 2010 Rossi was reported positive for EPO CERA by the Italian Olympic Committee. The Comitato Olimpico Nazionale Italiano (CONI) controlled her on 10 January after she finished second in the women's national cyclocross championships. However, on 2 April CONI revealed that the B Sample was returned non-positive. Rossi is the partner of Italian professional road bicycle racer Riccardo Riccò, who himself tested positive for CERA at the 2008 Tour de France.

References

External links
Riccò's partner positive for CERA - Cyclingnews.com.com

Doping cases in cycling
Italian female cyclists
Living people
1983 births
Place of birth missing (living people)
Italian sportspeople in doping cases
People from Cesena
Sportspeople from the Province of Forlì-Cesena
Cyclists from Emilia-Romagna